Grape (16 April 1996 – 12 October 2017), colloquially known as , was a Humboldt penguin (Spheniscus humboldti) at Tobu Zoo in Miyashiro, Saitama Prefecture, Japan. His attachment to a cutout of Hululu, an anthropomorphic Humboldt penguin character from the 2017 anime series Kemono Friends, earned him international fame and an online fan base. Grape-kun died after a brief illness in October 2017, and was commemorated by the zoo and his fans.

Early life
Grape was born at Hamura Zoo in Tokyo in 1996. He was named because of the color of the purple ring placed on his wing for identification; the suffix  is a Japanese honorific usually used when speaking to younger males. It is also commonly used for male pets. Along with his mate, Midori, he was transferred to Tobu Zoo in Miyashiro, Saitama, in March 2006. Midori and Grape-kun hatched a chick together, but the zoo removed the baby, citing inbreeding as the reason to separate it from its parents. The experience was difficult for the pair, and could have affected the bond between Grape-kun and Midori. Whether that loss was a factor or not, Midori left him for a younger penguin after a decade of being together. After this occurred, all of the other penguins in Grape-kun's exhibit rejected him, and he spent most of his time isolated from the rest of the colony.

Attachment to anime character cutout
In April 2017, Tobu Zoo placed 60 cutouts of characters from the popular anime series Kemono Friends around the grounds to attract visitors. The cutout placed in Grape-kun's enclosure, Hululu, was an anthropomorphic Humboldt penguin. Grape-kun would stare at the cutout for hours, going as far as trying to reach the cutout, which was placed on a tall rock. Zookeepers had to separate Grape-kun from the cutout for part of the day so he would eat. Media outlets described Grape-kun as having fallen "in love", and the zoo created a drink called "Loving Grape" described as a "perfect embodiment" of the penguin's relationship with his love.

Grape-kun's devotion to the cutout earned him fame and a global fan base on the Internet. Hululu's voice actress, Ikuko Chikuta, visited Grape-kun as part of an educational event on penguins. A festival honoring Grape-kun was planned, but his health began to decline in October. He was already elderly for a penguin and the zoo announced his death on 12 October. Zoo personnel created a small shrine in his honor, and several guests visited the penguin enclosure with flowers. Social media users paid tribute through the hashtag #grapekun, and many posted illustrations of Grape-kun and Hululu. In January 2018, Tobu Zoo placed a new cutout in the penguin enclosure, featuring Hululu and an illustration of Grape-kun standing side-by-side.

Gallery

See also
 List of individual birds

References

External links
 

Individual animals in Japan
Individual penguins
Internet memes
Tourist attractions in Saitama Prefecture
1996 animal births
2017 animal deaths